Margaret Ann Neve ( Harvey, 18 May 1792 – 4 April 1903) was the first recorded female supercentenarian and the second validated human to reach the age of 110 after Geert Adriaans Boomgaard. Neve lived at Saint Peter Port on the island of Guernsey in the English Channel. She was also the first proven individual whose life spanned three centuries (18th to the 20th centuries).

Family
By Margaret's birth, her family was already well-established on the island. Her father, John Harvey, was born in Cornwall in 1771 to John (1736–1778) and Margaret Ann Harvey (née Parker) (1736-1790). He was involved in merchant shipping and privateering, earning a great amount of wealth over the years, and married Elizabeth Harvey (née Guille) when they were both 19. John died on December 4th,  1820, at the age of 49, while Elizabeth lived with her remaining children in a house called "Chaumière" ("The Thatched Cottage"), which he had bought in 1808. Elizabeth died in 1871 at the age of 99.

Together they had seven children:
 Margaret (1792–1903)
 John (1793–1865) – married Anne Sophia Grut (1802–1844) in 1826 and moved to Jersey, then England. They had a son named Thomas, who served in the militia and became a merchant.
 Elizabeth (born in 1796) – married
 Mary (born in 1799) and Augusta (born in 1801) – died as infants
 Thomas (born in 1803) – emigrated to the United States
 Augusta (born in 1805) – married

Biography
Born as Marguerite Anne Harvey on 18 May 1792, the eldest of seven children, most of her childhood was spent in Guernsey, she later anglicized her name to Margaret Ann. Early in her life, she survived a fall down the stairs, which left her concussed for three days.

Neve, as she would become known, could remember the turmoil that the French Revolution brought to Guernsey; at the time, her father was in command of the militia on the island. In 1807, at the age of 15, Neve set sail for Weymouth with her father, but a storm caused the ship to land at Chesil Beach.

She was educated in Bristol, England, gaining an interest in literature and poetry. In 1815, she went to a "finishing school" in Brussels, becoming fluent in French and Italian and able to converse in German and Spanish. She would read the New Testament in Greek.

With her headmistress, she visited the battlefield of Waterloo, shortly after the battle, once the corpses had been buried. There, Margaret picked up souvenirs which she showed to Prussian Field Marshal Blücher in London.

Neve met with Charles François Dumouriez, a general of the French Revolutionary Wars, who dubbed her "la spirituelle".

Margaret married John Neve, born 1779, from Tenterden, Kent, in St Peter Port (Town) church on 18 January 1823. On their honeymoon, they visited the Waterloo battlefield, 8 years after the battle. She lived in England for 25 years of marriage, but when her husband died in 1849, she returned to Guernsey. They had no children.

The census for 1871 shows Margaret A. Neve (78) and her sister Elizabeth Harvey (73) living at 'Chaumière', Rouge Huis, St Peter Port, Guernsey. Neve travelled abroad to various countries with Elizabeth. Their last trip was in 1872 when Neve was 80, wherein they visited the Polish city of Krakow (then part of the Austro-Hungarian Empire).

On 18 May 1899, a reception was held at Rouge Huis to celebrate her 107th birthday and her entrance into her 108th year. The town council, jurats, the officers of the staff, and about 250 of the leading residents attended. Despite her age, Margaret was found making marmalade the next morning by a reporter from The Times. She was reported as never being ill until the age of 105 when she had the flu, followed by bronchitis at 108. At the age of 110, she climbed a tree to pluck an apple, explaining that they were much tastier when eaten straight from the tree.

A newspaper report records that she enjoyed a glass and a half of old sherry at lunchtime, followed by a weak whiskey and water at supper. She was in the habit of always rising early and abstaining from eating and drinking between meal times. Contrary to popular belief, she did not receive congratulations from Queen Victoria (who had died in 1901) upon reaching her 110th birthday (celebrated in 1902). However, the Harvey family (through Neve's niece Louisa) did exchange correspondence with the Royal Household, expressing gratitude for the signed photograph given to them on 4 May 1896 by the Queen.

Neve died on 4 April 1903, a month before her 111th birthday. She reportedly repeated a Psalm in a loud voice the day before she died. Flags in Guernsey were lowered to half mast as a show of respect. She was one of the last few living people from the 18th century.

See also
 List of British supercentenarians
 List of the verified oldest people
 Salome Sellers – (1800–1909) last surviving person from the 18th century
 Nabi Tajima (1900–2018), the last known surviving person born in the 19th century.
 Gallery of supercentenarian's born before 1850 Gerontology Research Group (GRG), published 5 January 2018

References

1792 births
1903 deaths
British supercentenarians
Guernsey women
Women supercentenarians
Oldest people
People from Saint Peter Port